Jamall Lee (born March 13, 1987) is a former professional Canadian football running back who played for three seasons for the BC Lions of the Canadian Football League. He was signed by the Carolina Panthers of the National Football League as an undrafted free agent in 2009 and released at the end of the pre-season, making him an NFL free agent. He was drafted by the BC Lions third overall in the 2009 CFL Draft. He played CIS football for the Bishop's Gaiters.

Early years
Lee was born in New Westminster, British Columbia. His father, Orville Lee, was the last Canadian to lead the Canadian Football League in rushing, in the 1988 CFL season. Jamall played Canadian football at Terry Fox Secondary School and though he was not recruited by any American college football or Canadian university teams, his father's connections with Bishop's University in Lennoxville, Quebec, gave him an opportunity to play for the Gaiters.

University career
At Bishop's, Lee ran for a four-year total of 4,296 yards, which made him the Quebec University Football League's all-time leading rusher. He was also selected as the QUFL's most outstanding player of 2007 and a CIS first team all-star for the 2008 CIS football season. He was the only Canadian selected to play in the 2009 Texas vs. The Nation Game in El Paso, Texas. Ahead of the 2009 CFL Evaluation Camp, Lee was ranked second amongst those eligible for the 2009 CFL Draft.

Professional career

Carolina Panthers
Lee signed with the Carolina Panthers as an undrafted free agent on April 27, 2009. Lee dressed for all four pre-season games for the Panthers including their final on September 3, 2009, in which he scored the team's sole touchdown.

He was released from the team before the start of the 2009 regular season.

BC Lions
On October 12, 2009, the BC Lions announced that they had agreed to terms with Lee and he dressed for the final four games of the season. On October 31, 2009, Lee recorded his first career reception against the Calgary Stampeders. Lee played in both playoff games and recorded one rush for -1 yards and one catch for -5 yards in the Eastern Final. After three seasons as a special teams player and backup running back, he announced his retirement on February 13, 2012.

References

External links

1987 births
Living people
Sportspeople from New Westminster
Players of Canadian football from British Columbia
Black Canadian players of American football
American football running backs
Canadian football running backs
Bishop's Gaiters football players
BC Lions players
Canadian people of Jamaican descent